Soce  is a village in the administrative district of Gmina Narew, within Hajnówka County, Podlaskie Voivodeship, in north-eastern Poland.

The village is inhabited mostly by Orthodox Belarusians.

An ethnographic-tourist project called "The Land of Open Shutters" is realized in Soce. The main objective of this project is to preserve an original wooden architecture of cabin-like old cottages with intricately carved ornaments like vibrant and colourful shutters or dynamically designed edge guards.

Despite the recently increased modernisation, the traditional architecture is still in evidence.

The Land of Open Shutters in Soce

References

Soce